Przyborze may refer to the following places:
Przyborze, Lubusz Voivodeship (west Poland)
Przyborze, Pomeranian Voivodeship (north Poland)
Przyborze, West Pomeranian Voivodeship (north-west Poland)